De-Excluded Area D.G. Khan is a tehsil located in Dera Ghazi Khan District, Punjab, Pakistan. The population is 212,430 according to the 2017 census.

See also 
 List of tehsils of Punjab, Pakistan

References 

Tehsils of Punjab, Pakistan
Populated places in Dera Ghazi Khan District